The Journal of Parapsychology is a biannual peer-reviewed academic journal covering research on psi phenomena, including telepathy, clairvoyance, precognition, and psychokinesis, as well as human consciousness in general and anomalous experiences.

It was established in April 1937 by Joseph Banks Rhine (Duke University). It is published by the Rhine Research Center and the current editor-in-chief is Sally Ann Drucker (Rhine Research Center). The journal is abstracted and indexed in PsycINFO. It publishes research reports, theoretical discussions, book reviews, and correspondence, as well as the abstracts of papers presented at the Parapsychological Association's annual meeting.

See also
 Journal of the American Society for Psychical Research
 Journal of Near-Death Studies
 Journal of Consciousness Studies
 Journal of Scientific Exploration
 Parapsychology

References

External links 
 

Parapsychology
Psychology journals
Biannual journals
English-language journals
Publications established in 1937
Fringe science journals